Westpark Mustard was a white and black racing greyhound in the 1970s. By Newdown Heather out of April Merry she broke the British and European record of 19 consecutive victories held by Mick the Miller, when recording a 20th consecutive win on 28 October 1974.

Racing career
Westpark Mustard was entered for the 1973 English Greyhound Derby but the race distance was too short for her. She began to come to prominence over staying distances (longer distance races) and on 7 January 1974 won the Abbey Cup at Wembley Stadium beating Myrtown by a head, which was the first win of the 20 race British and European record.

The run was extended to five wins after she won the Longcross Cup at White City Stadium in February. Trained by Tom Johnston Jr., the bitch won another ten races including winning the GRA Stakes and setting a track record at Brough Park over 725 yards. She had captured the public's imagination and with the winning sequence standing at 15 she broke into season on 12 May.

After seasonal rest her connections entered her for one off open races, deciding to avoid the Gold Collar and Cesarewitch. Five open race wins secured the new British and European record feat of 20 successive victories with the 20th win aptly named the Mick The Miller Record Stakes. The record consisted entirely of open races.

The winning sequence failed to extend past 20 wins following a series of unfortunate incidents that led to her being beaten at Shelbourne Park. Her owner Cyril Young (who ran his greyhounds under the alias Cyril Scotland) was receiving criticism from the Scottish press for using an alias name which upset him and therefore he decided to run the greyhound in Ireland. His trainer Tom Johnston had reservations about changing the greyhounds routine which proved true when Westpark Mustard failed to win her next race. To make matters worse she was seriously ill after the race. After several more races she was retired to stud with breeder Dave Murphy.

British & European record

Pedigree

References

Greyhound racing in the United Kingdom
Racing greyhounds
Individual animals in England
1970s in England
1971 animal births